MV Kota Pinang was a cargo liner ordered by Rotterdamsche Lloyd and built by Nederlandsche Scheepsbouw Maatschappij in Amsterdam in 1930. She was launched on 23 November 1930. In May 1940, the ship was requisitioned by the Kriegsmarine, renamed to the MV Clara and converted into a Reconnaissance scout  for naval operations by the German battleship  and cruiser  in the Atlantic.  In June 1941, the ship was converted again to operate as a U-boat supply vessel. On the 3 October 1941, she was sunk by the British cruiser .

Construction
The Kota Pinang was one of a number of cargo liners built from the mid-1920s onwards by Rotterdam Lloyds to take Muslim pilgrims from the Dutch East Indies to Jeddah, on their journey to the Hajj. The first ship in the series was the Kota Inten built in 1928.

Sinking
At 17:18 hours, the Kota Pinang reported a ship behind her. Kota Pinang attempted to disguise herself by signalling that she was an English freighter, in an attempt to lure Kenya across the line of fire, of her escort Heavy rain stymied her efforts and at 17:28 hours Kenya opened fire on the Kota Pinang, which was heavily damaged. At 17:43 the captain ordered the crew to abandon ship and at 17:45, scuttling charges exploded in the Kota Pinang engine room. The Kenya fired a single torpedo to complete the ships sinking.

The  had been ordered to escort the Kota Pinang to the South Atlantic and waited at their rendezvous point, not realising she had already been sunk.

References

1929 ships
Ships built by Nederlandsche Scheepsbouw Maatschappij
Auxiliary ships of the Kriegsmarine
Ships of Germany
Ships of the Netherlands